Me and Marilyn is a 2009 Italian comedy film directed by Leonardo Pieraccioni.

Cast

See also
Marilyn Monroe in popular culture

References

External links

2009 films
Films directed by Leonardo Pieraccioni
2000s Italian-language films
2009 comedy films
Italian comedy films
Italian romantic comedy films
2000s Italian films